Miran Maričić (born 17 June 1997 in Bjelovar) is a Croatian sport shooter. He won the Junior World Champion title at ISSF Junior World Championship in Suhl, Germany 2017. On the 2018 ISSF World Shooting Championship held between 31 August - 15 September 2018 in Changwon, South Korea he won bronze medal in 10m Air Rifle Men and also a Tokyo 2020 Olympic Quota place for Croatia. Miran is a member of a shooting team "SD Bjelovar 1874" under his personal coach Damir Bošnjak. He studies information technology at Faculty of Organization and Informatics Varaždin (FOI).

Miran also won Dražen Petrović Award in 2017 for talented young athletes and teams for outstanding sporting results and sports development.

References

External links

1997 births
Croatian male sport shooters
Living people
ISSF rifle shooters
Sportspeople from Bjelovar
European Games competitors for Croatia
Shooters at the 2019 European Games
Shooters at the 2020 Summer Olympics
20th-century Croatian people
21st-century Croatian people